Antimony triselenide is the chemical compound with the formula . The material exists as the sulfosalt mineral antimonselite (IMA symbol: Atm), which crystallizes in an orthorhombic space group. In this compound, antimony has a formal oxidation state +3 and selenium −2. The bonding in this compound has covalent character as evidenced by the black color and semiconducting properties of this and related materials. The low-frequency dielectric constant (ε0) has been measured to be 133 along the c axis of the crystal at room temperature, which is unusually large. Its band gap is 1.18 eV at room temperature.

The compound may be formed by the reaction of antimony with selenium and has a melting point of 885 K.

Applications
 
 is now being actively explored for application thin-film solar cells. A record light-to-electricity conversion efficiency of 9.2% has been reported.

References

Selenides
Antimony(III) compounds